Walter M. Baker (September 23, 1927 – April 17, 2012) was first elected to the Maryland Senate in 1979. He represented District 36, which covered Caroline, Cecil, Kent, Queen Annes's, and Talbot counties.

Education
Baker earned his B.A. from Washington College in 1960. He attended the University of Maryland School of Law, LL.B., graduating in 1960.

Career
Baker served in the United States Army from 1950 to 1953. After college, he was admitted to the Maryland Bar in 1960. He served as an attorney before being elected as a State Senator in 1979. He was defeated in 2003 by E. J. Pipkin.

Election results
2002 Race for Maryland State Senate – District 36
{| class="wikitable"
|-
!Name
!Votes
!Percent
!Outcome
|-
|-
|E. J. Pipkin, Rep.
|24,827
|  62.5%
|   Won
|-
|-
|Walter M. Baker, Dem.
|14,898
|  37.5%
|   Lost
|-
|Other Write-Ins
|27
|  0.1%
|   Lost
|}

1998 Race for Maryland State Senate – District 36
{| class="wikitable"
|-
!Name
!Votes
!Percent
!Outcome
|-
|-
|Walter M. Baker, Dem.
|18,517
|  58%
|   Won
|-
|-
|Allaire D. Williams, Rep.
|13,650
|  42%
|   Lost
|}

1994 Race for Maryland State Senate – District 36
{| class="wikitable"
|-
!Name
!Votes
!Percent
!Outcome
|-
|-
|Walter M. Baker, Dem.
|17,981
|  98%
|   Won
|-
|-
|Janice L. Graham, Dem.
|302
|  2%
|   Lost
|}

1990 Race for Maryland State Senate – District 36
{| class="wikitable"
|-
!Name
!Votes
!Percent
!Outcome
|-
|-
|Walter M. Baker, Dem.
|14,431
|  100%
|   Won
|}

1986 Race for Maryland State Senate – District 36
{| class="wikitable"
|-
!Name
!Votes
!Percent
!Outcome
|-
|-
|Walter M. Baker, Dem.
|12,204
|  58%
|   Won
|-
|-
|Bernard M. Hopkins, Rep.
|8,778
|  42%
|   Lost
|}

References and notes

External links
 http://www.msa.md.gov/msa/mdmanual/05sen/former/html/msa12141.html

1927 births
2012 deaths
People from Port Deposit, Maryland
United States Army soldiers
Washington College alumni
University of Maryland Francis King Carey School of Law alumni
Maryland lawyers
Democratic Party Maryland state senators
20th-century American lawyers